Reda Shehata (born January 24, 1981 in Egypt) is an Egyptian football midfielder. He is currently the head coach of El Gouna FC.

Managerial statistics

External links 

1981 births
Living people
Egyptian footballers
Egypt international footballers
Al Ahly SC players
Association football midfielders
Al Ittihad Alexandria Club players
Egyptian Premier League players